Kyirong County or Gyirong County, called Jilong County by China ), is a county of the Shigatse Prefecture, Tibet Autonomous Region. It is famous because of its mild climatically conditions and its abundant vegetation which is unusual for the Tibetan plateau. The capital lies at Zongga. Its name in Tibetan, Dzongka means "mud walls".

It is one of the four counties that comprise the Qomolangma National Nature Preserve (Kyirong, Dinggyê, Nyalam, and Tingri).

In 1945 Peter Aufschnaiter counted 26 temples and monasteries which covered the area of sKyid-grong and the neighboring La-sdebs. The most famous temple of sKyid-grong is the Byams-sprin lha-khang, erected by the famous Tibetan king Srong-btsan sgam-po (Songtsän Gampo) as one of the four Yang-´dul temples in the 7th century A.D. During the 11th century the famous South Asian scholar Atisha visited sKyi-grong. sKyid-grong was one of the favorite meditation places of the Tibetan Yogin Mi-la ras-pa (Milarepa).

The local Kyirong language has been researched thoroughly and folk literature of this region was collected and published during the 1980s.

Special places 
Of outstanding importance are the Byams-sprin lha-khang temple, which was built in the 7th century A. D., and the ´Phags-pa lha-khang temple. The ´Phags-pa lha-khang formerly contained one of the holiest Avalokiteshvara statues of Tibet, the statue of the Ārya Va-ti bzang-po. This statue was brought to India in 1959 and is now kept in Dharamsala.

Of some importance is the bKra-shis bdam-gtan gling monastery, founded by yongs-´dzin Ye-shes rgyal-mtshan (1713–1793), who was one of the teachers of the 8th Dalai Lama.

Lake Paiku is in this county.

Towns and townships
 Dzongka or Zongga Town
 Kyirong or Gyirong Town
 Trepa or Zheba Township
 Gungtang or Gongdang Township()
 Drakna or Chana Township

Transportation
Up to 1960 one of the main trade routes between Nepal and Tibet passed through this region. Easily accessible from Nepal, it was used several times as an entrance gate for military actions from the site of Nepal against Tibet. In 2017, Chinese soldiers began building a new road on the Tibetan side of the border, and intend to continue construction into Nepal via Rasuwa pending approval from Kathmandu.

A possibility of a transborder railway link along a similar route (Gyirong to Kathmandu via Rasuwa) is considered as well.

Maps

References

Bibliography 
 
 
 
 
 
 
 
 Roland Bielmeier, Silke Herrmann: Märchen, Sagen und Schwänke vom Dach der Welt. Tibetisches Erzählgut in Deutscher Fassung, Band 3. Viehzüchtererzählungen sowie Erzählgut aus sKyid-grong und Ding-ri, gesammelt und ins Deutsche übertragen. Vereinigung für Geschichtswissenschaft Hochasiens Wissenschaftsverlag (= Beiträge zur tibetischen Erzählforschung, 3), Sankt Augustin 1982
 Harrer, Heinrich: Seven Years in Tibet; Beyond Seven Years in Tibet: My Life Before, During, and After (2007)
 Aufschnaiter, Peter: Land and Places of Milarepa. East and West, 26 (1976):1-2, S. 175-189
 Brauen, Martin: Heinrich Harrers Impressionen aus Tibet. Innsbruck, 1974
 Brauen, Martin: Peter Aufschnaiter. Sein Leben in Tibet. Innsbruck, 1983
 Ehrhard, Franz-Karl: Die Statue des Ārya Va-ti bzang-po. Wiesbaden, 2004
 Huber, Brigitte: The Tibetan Dialect of Lende (Kyi-rong): a grammatical description with historical annotations. Bonn, 2005
 Dieter Schuh: Das Archiv des Klosters bKra-shis bsam-gtan gling von sKyid-grong''. Bonn, 1988

 
Counties of Tibet
Shigatse